Varning för Jönssonligan is a Swedish film about the gang Jönssonligan made in 1981.

It was the first Swedish adaptation of one of the original Danish Olsen-banden movies. Somewhat ironically, it was based on the sixth Olsen Gang movie, Olsen-bandens sidste bedrifter, which was intended as the last one when it was made.

Cast
Gösta Ekman as Charles-Ingvar "Sickan" Jönsson
Ulf Brunnberg as Ragnar Vanheden
Nils Brandt as Rocky
Siw Malmkvist as Eivor
Per Grundén as Wall-Enberg Jr.
Jan-Olof Strandberg as Svensson
Tomas Norström as Holm
Weiron Holmberg as Biffen
Johannes Brost as robber
Peter Hüttner as robber

External links 

Swedish crime comedy films
Jönssonligan films
Varning for Jonssonligan
1980s crime comedy films
1981 comedy films
1980s Swedish-language films
1980s Swedish films